A gyroscope is a device for measuring or maintaining orientation, based on the principle of conservation of angular momentum.

Gyroscope may also refer to:

Ring laser gyroscope, uses ring lasers
Fibre optic gyroscope, uses fibre optics and light interference
Rate integrating gyroscope, a type of rate gyro
Vibrating structure gyroscope, functions much like the halteres of an insect
Gyroscope (automobile), an American brass era car 1908–1909
"Gyroscope" (software), a web framework written in PHP and JavaScript
Gyroscope (video game), a video game published by Melbourne House
Operation Gyroscope, a program by the US military

Music
Gyroscope (band), a post-grunge rock band from Perth, Western Australia

Songs
"Gyroscope" (song), a promotional single and song from the album Transmission by The Tea Party
"Gyroscope", a song from the album Whoracle by In Flames 
"Gyroscope", a song from the album Emergency & I by The Dismemberment Plan
"Gyroscope", a song from the album Geogaddi by Boards of Canada